Erin Hill is an American harpist, singer, songwriter and actress. Her Celtic album hit #1 on the Billboard World Music Chart and she has played and sung with Kanye West, Cyndi Lauper, Moby, Sinéad O'Connor, Enya, a-ha, Randy Newman, Jewel, Josh Groban, and many other celebrities, as well as Hillary Clinton, Michelle Obama, and for royalty.

As an actress, she has appeared on Broadway, film, and television, most notably as the Pretty White Girl Who Sings Dave’s Thoughts on Comedy Central’s Chappelle's Show. She originated the roles of Kate Mullins in Titanic on Broadway, and of Lulu in the Sam Mendes/Rob Marshall revival of Cabaret  and appears on both Original Broadway Cast recordings. She played Sandra Mescal in the Tim Robbins film Cradle Will Rock and appears on the Original Motion Picture Soundtrack. She is an actor, composer and screenwriter in the film Clear Blue Tuesday, about which the New York Times said: "Erin Hill, as a giddy, harp-playing Trekker, stands out… The best and funniest scene in the film is Ms. Hill's".

The Los Angeles record label Cleopatra Records has released three of Hill’s albums, starting with Harp Town in 2016. Harp Town features Hill’s harp and voice arrangements of songs by artists such as Rihanna, Radiohead, The Beatles, Sinatra, Leonard Cohen, Edith Piaf, Adele, Lady Gaga, Smashing Pumpkins, Kansas, Alicia Keys, Roxy Music, and Kate Bush. Cleopatra also released Hill’s album Christmas Harp, and her album of originals, Girl Inventor.

Hill is an avid science fiction fan and a regular performer at Dragon Con in Atlanta, and her "Lookout, Science" and "Giant Mushrooms" music videos were featured in the Dragon Con Independent Film Festival. USA Today premiered her sci-fi music video "Lookout, Science". Her westie dog MacLeod (named for the main character in the film Highlander) is a frequent co-star in her music videos.  Her three electric harps are named V’ger (from Star Trek), Klaatu (from The Day the Earth Stood Still), and Ylla (from The Martian Chronicles).

Hill was featured in an HBO Game of Thrones promo, playing the Game of Thrones theme on her harp. She won an Independent Music Award for her song "Stun," from her Girl Inventor album. and she did Original Music and Sound Design for the Drama Desk Award-nominated That Play: a Solo Macbeth.  Hill is also the voice and harp behind Tafne, a central character in the Android video game The Legacy of Barubash. Hill has also played her harp several years for the US Open Tennis Championships in the exclusive Hospitality Pavilion. Newsday has called her "the dangerously enjoyable Erin Hill."

In 2019, she debuted her show “Harp Oddity: The Music of David Bowie,” featuring Hill’s arrangements of Bowie tunes on vocals and electric harp, along with her band.

Discography

 I'm So Glad by Erin Hill (March 2019) Gridley Records. Erin Hill: songwriter, vocals, harp, percussion
 Pirate Jane (feat. Erin Hill) by The Peter Ulrich Collaboration (March 2018) City Canyons. Erin Hill: vocals, bass.
 Girl Inventor by Erin Hill (July 2017) Cleopatra. Erin Hill: songwriter, vocals, harp, keyboards, bass.
 Christmas Harp by Erin Hill (October 2016) Cleopatra.  Erin Hill: vocals, harp, arrangements.
 Harp Town by Erin Hill (May 2016) Cleopatra.  Erin Hill: vocals, harp, arrangements.
 Tempus Fugitives by The Peter Ulrich Collaboration (April 2015) City Canyons. Erin Hill: songwriter, vocals, harp, bass.
 Dark Daddy (feat. Erin Hill) by The Peter Ulrich Collaboration (November 2014) City Canyons. Erin Hill: songwriter, vocals, harp, bass.
 World of Nickhoo by The Dream Jam Band (April 2014) Dream Jam Productions. Erin Hill:  vocals, harp
Let It Snow by Jewel (September 2013) Somerset Group, Ltd.  Erin Hill: harp
 Clear Blue Tuesday (Soundtrack for the Original Musical Movie) (August 2010) by Various Artists. Sh-K-Boom Records. Erin Hill: songwriter, vocals, harp, bass.
Leave it in the Soup (July 2010) by The Dream Jam Band. Dream Jam Productions, EMI. Produced by Rick Chertoff. Erin Hill: songwriter, vocals, bass, harp, keyboards; arranger on Shoes, co-producer on Melanie the Mermaid
Four Leaf Clover by Four Celtic Voices with Celeste Ray & Erin Hill (2009) Gridley Records. Erin Hill: songwriter, vocals, harp, bass.
Vapor by Taylor Barton with Wicked Felina (2006) Green Mirror. Produced by G.E. Smith. Erin Hill: co-writer, vocals, harp, guitar, keyboards, hammered dulcimer.
The Fantasticks (2006) Ghostlight Records/ Razor and Tie. The new Off-Broadway recording. Erin Hill: harpist.
Martha Wainwright by Martha Wainwright (2005) Zoe Records. Erin Hill: harpist.
Pyjama Party by Frederic Buchet (2005) Gridley Records. Erin Hill: producer, co-writer, vocals, harp, accordion, hammered dulcimer, analog synths.
Frost as Desired by Erin Hill (2002) Gridley Records. Erin Hill: songwriter, vocals, guitars, harp, synths.
I See a Great City by Clan Chi (2002) Crisnjoco.  Erin Hill: vocalist
Pretty Flowers by The Buddy Scott Trio (2002) Gridley Records. Erin Hill: vocals, executive producer.
 Great Musicals by Various Artists (2001) RCA, BMG Entertainment. Erin Hill: vocals.
Cradle Will Rock (1999) RCA. Motion picture soundtrack, directed by Tim Robbins.  Erin Hill: vocals.
Cabaret  (1998) RCA. The new Broadway cast recording, directed by Sam Mendes. Erin Hill: vocals, harp, flute, saxophone.
Night of the Hunter (1998) Varese Sarabande.  Erin Hill: vocals.
Titanic (1997) RCA Victor. The Original Broadway Cast Recording. Erin Hill: vocals.
Honkytonk Highway (1996) Original Cast Recording. Erin Hill: vocals, harp, fiddle, lap steel, guitar, bass, percussion, keyboards, saxophone.

Filmography

Television

Stage

Broadway

Off-Broadway and regional theater

Screenwriter

 (2010) Fade to White
 (2009) Clear Blue Tuesday

Soundtrack (film and television)
 Jes and Lora (Short) (2015) performer: "I'm So Glad", writer: "I'm So Glad"
 That's What She Told Me (2011) composer.  writer: "The Jubilation," "Silver Feet," "No Other You."  performer: "The Jubilation", "Silver Feet"  
 Clear Blue Tuesday  (2009) writer, performer:  "Prologue", "Reckless". co-writer: "Move High"
 A Mock Time: A Star Trek Wedding (2007) writer: "Intro: Mock's Brain" and "Main Theme: The Bridegroom of Gothos"
 The Shabbos Bigfoot (2006) writer: "Waking Up and No Other You". Performer: "Waking Up and No Other You"
 American Desi (2001) writer: "Lolita (Lo and Behold)". "Performer: Lolita (Lo and Behold)"
 $pent (2000) writer: "Do it Yourself". Performer: "Do it Yourself"
 Bad Bride (2000) (TV) writer, performer: "Waking Up". 
 So, What's in Jericho? (1999) performer: "Precious Memories" 
 Cradle Will Rock (1999) performer: "Let's Do Something", "The Cradle Will Rock", "Honolulu", "Oh What a Filthy Night Court", "Art for Art's Sake"
 The 52nd Annual Tony Awards (1998) (TV) performer: "Willkommen"
 Macy's 21st Annual Fourth of July Fireworks Spectacular (1997) (TV) "performer: Lady's Maid"
 The 51st Annual Tony Awards (1997) (TV) "performer: Ship of Dreams"

References

External links
 
 
 
 

American harpists
American jazz harpists
American rock harpists
American sopranos
Nerd-folk musicians
Geek rock musicians
Science fiction music
American stage actresses
Singers from New York City
Actresses from New York City
Artists from New York City
Year of birth missing (living people)
Musicians from Louisville, Kentucky
Actresses from Louisville, Kentucky
Living people
Singer-songwriters from Kentucky
Kentucky women musicians
Singers from Kentucky
Women harpists
Jazz musicians from New York (state)
Singer-songwriters from New York (state)
21st-century American women
Jazz harpists